Lunasea is an album by saxophonist Lee Konitz and pianist Peggy Stern which was recorded in 1992 and released on the Italian Soul Note label.

Critical reception 

The Allmusic review stated "Konitz and his players perform everything from jams in the Lennie Tristano tradition and Brazilian pieces that are almost pop-oriented to free improvisations. Stern is quite impressive throughout the date. Classically trained, she proves from the start that she has a real talent at improvisation and is not afraid to take chances. Konitz sounds inspired by her presence and their interplay makes this an easily recommended set for adventurous listeners".

Track listing 
All compositions by Peggy Stern except where noted.
 "Subconscious Lee II" (Lee Konitz) – 7:10
 "Femaleon" (Konitz, Stern) – 4:06
 "Bossa Tia" – 5:49
 "The Final Blow" (Konitz, Stern) – 4:31
 "Lunasea" – 5:27
 "Matter of Opinion" – 4:26
 "The Aerie" – 5:46
 "Leeway" – 6:13
 "Stanbye" – 4:20
 "To Peggy" (Vic Juris, Konitz) – 3:25
 "Solo Too" – 1:40
 "Opertune" – 6:00
 "Djuo" (Konitz, Stern) – 4:17
 "S'gone" – 5:52
 "P.S." (Konitz, Stern) – 1:27

Personnel 
Lee Konitz – alto saxophone
Peggy Stern – piano
Vic Juris – guitar
Harvie Swartz – bass
Jeff Williams – drums
Guilherme Franco – percussion

References 

Lee Konitz albums
Peggy Stern albums
1992 albums
Black Saint/Soul Note albums